This is a list of listed buildings in Northern Ireland, which are among the listed buildings of the United Kingdom.

Key

The organization of the lists in this series is on the same basis as the statutory register. The county names are those used in the register, which in the case of Northern Ireland means the province's six traditional counties.

Grade A listed buildings in Northern Ireland

Grade B+ listed buildings in Northern Ireland

See also
List of castles in Ireland
List of monastic houses in Ireland
List of country houses in the United Kingdom
Listed buildings in Scotland
Listed buildings in England
Listed buildings in Wales

Notes

External links
Northern Ireland Buildings Database

 
 

Lists of listed buildings in Northern Ireland